Hans Klein (11 July 1931 – 26 November 1996) was a German politician (CSU) who served as Vice President of the Bundestag from 1990 until his death in 1996.

Klein had previously served  as Minister for Special Affairs from 1989 to 1990 and as Minister for Economic Cooperation from 1987 to 1989 both in Helmut Kohl's third cabinet.

References

1931 births
1996 deaths
Economic Cooperation ministers of Germany
People from Šumperk
Alumni of the University of Leicester
Members of the Bundestag 1980–1983
Members of the Bundestag 1983–1987
Members of the Bundestag 1987–1990
Members of the Bundestag 1990–1994
Members of the Bundestag 1994–1998
Members of the Bundestag 1976–1980
Christian Social Union in Bavaria politicians